Queers in History is an encyclopedia written by Keith Stern of historically prominent people who were lesbian, gay, bisexual, or transgender (LGBT).  

It was first published on diskette in early 1993, and in an expanded CD-ROM format by the end of 1994.  It was one of the first new media titles to be distributed through bookstores.  It was available in over 600 independent bookstores worldwide, and at selected locations of leading book selling chains in the UK and US.  It went out of print in 1996.

A new, completely revised edition was published as a trade paperback by BenBella Books in September 2009.  It features a foreword by Ian McKellen.

References 
 

Encyclopedias of sexuality
LGBT history
Biographies about LGBT people
Books about LGBT history
Publications established in 1993
Queer literature
Biographical dictionaries
Encyclopedias of history
1990s LGBT literature
BenBella Books books